Anuj is an Australian pop singer. He had three top 50 singles on the ARIA singles chart. He is currently a member of Sydney hip hop outfit King Farook sharing lead vocal duties with Antonio Chiappetta.

Discography

Albums

Singles

References

Australian male singers
Living people
Indian emigrants to Australia
Year of birth missing (living people)